Ľubomír Galko (born 14 February 1968, Klieština, Považská Bystrica) is a former minister of defense of Slovakia. A former member and vice-chairman for regions of Freedom and Solidarity (Sloboda a Solidarita, SaS), he is now a member of the extra-parliamentary Democratic Party (Demokratická strana, DS), though he has retained his seat in parliament.

Life 
Galko studied at the mathematics and physics faculty of the Comenius University in Bratislava from 1986 to 1991. He lives in Stupava, a town near Bratislava.

References

External links
Biography

External links

1968 births
Living people
People from Považská Bystrica District
Comenius University alumni
Members of the National Council (Slovakia) 2010-2012
Members of the National Council (Slovakia) 2012-2016
Members of the National Council (Slovakia) 2016-2020
Defence Ministers of Slovakia
Freedom and Solidarity politicians